Joutseno is a former town and municipality of Finland. It is located in the province of Southern Finland and is part of the South Karelia region.

The municipality was unilingually Finnish. Joutseno was consolidated with Lappeenranta on 1 January 2009.

It bordered Lappeenranta, Taipalsaari, Ruokolahti and Imatra, prior to 1967 it bordered Lappee instead of Lappeenranta and prior to 1989 it bordered Nuijamaa. The municipality also had a 9 km border with Russia, more specifically its Vyborgsky District.

Geography

Lakes 
Joutseno is located by Finland's largest lake Saimaa.

History 
The name Joutseno is usually connected to the word joutsen meaning "swan" (hence the coat of arms), however it may also refer to joutsi, a dialectal variant of the word jousi, "bow (weapon)", the genitive of which is joutsen.

Joutseno has existed at least since 1544, when it was mentioned as Jousenby as a village of Jääski, which is now a part of Russia as Lesogorsky. Joutseno became a separate parish in 1639 and was originally called Joutsenus. The current name Joutseno has referred to the parish since the 18th century, but became the predominant spelling in the 19th century.

Joutseno became a town in 2005. It was consolidated with Lappeenranta in 2009.

Places to visit
 The Local History Museum
 Joutseno Church
 South Karelian Motor Museum
 The Domestic Animal Park of Korpikeidas
 The storm monument by the library
 Lake Ahvenlampi
 The Myllymäki skiing center

International relations

Twin towns — Sister cities
Joutseno is twinned with:
Säter, Sweden

References

External links

 Joutseno Official website
 Joutseno High School Official website

Former municipalities of Finland
Lappeenranta
Populated places disestablished in 2009
2009 disestablishments in Finland